Kenneth Moffitt (2 February 1933 – 29 August 2016) was an English professional footballer who played in the Football League for Gateshead. A left back and left half, he also played in the Scottish League for Berwick Rangers.

References 

1933 births
Footballers from Newcastle upon Tyne
Association football fullbacks
English footballers
2016 deaths
Association football wing halves
Berwick Rangers F.C. players
English Football League players
Gateshead A.F.C. players
Brentford F.C. players
Scottish Football League players